The Extreme Southern Italian dialects are a set of languages spoken in Salento, Calabria, Sicily and southern Cilento with common phonetic and syntactic characteristics such as to constitute a single group. These languages derive, without exception, from vulgar Latin and not from Tuscan; therefore it follows that the name "Italian" is a purely geographical reference.

Today, Extreme Southern Italian dialects are still spoken daily, although their use is limited to informal contexts and is mostly oral. There are examples of full literary uses with contests (mostly poetry) and theatrical performances.

Background
The territory where the Extreme Southern dialects are found roughly traces the Byzantine territory in 9th century Italy. In this territory the spoken language was Greek, which still survives in some areas of Calabria and Salento and is known as Grico, Grecanico, Greek of Italy and other denominations (see Greek linguistic minority of Italy).

Varieties
Sicilian, spoken on the island of Sicily: Western Sicilian; Central Metafonetica; Southeast Metafonetica; Ennese; Eastern Nonmetafonetica; Messinese.
 Sicilian dialects on other islands: Isole Eolie, on the Aeolian Islands; Pantesco, on the island of Pantelleria.
Calabro, or Central-Southern Calabrian: dialects are spoken in the central and southern areas of the region of Calabria.
Salentino, spoken in the Salento region of southern Apulia. 
Southern Cilentan: spoken in Roccagloriosa and Rofrano in southern tip of Cilento, which is southern Province of Salerno, in the Campania region.
Cilentan: spoken in Cilento, influenced by both Neapolitan language and Sicilian language.

Phonological features
The main characteristics that the extreme southern dialects have in common, differentiating them from the rest of the southern area dialects are

 Sicilian vowel system, a characteristic not present, however, in many dialects of central-northern Calabria;
 presence of three well perceptible final vowels in most dialects of this area: -i, -u, -a; in Cosentino and in central-southern Salento, however, the final -e is also preserved;
 cacuminal or retroflex pronunciation of -DD- deriving from -LL-. This phenomenon is also found in part of Campania and Basilicata;
 maintenance of voiceless occlusive consonants after the nasals: the word for "eats" will therefore be pronounced mancia and not mangia. However, this phenomenon is absent in Cosentino;
 absence of apocopated infinitives spread from the Upper Mezzogiorno to Tuscany (therefore one has cantare or cantari and not cantà). Also in this respect the Cosentino dialect is an exception;
 use of the preterite with endings similar to the Italian remote past and the non-distinction between past perfect and past past; however, this phenomenon is absent in central-northern Calabria (north of the Lamezia Terme-Sersale-Crotone line).

See also
 Languages of Italy

Bibliography
 Francesco Avolio, Lingue e dialetti d'Italia, 2012, Carocci editore, Roma, ed=2, .
 Giuseppe Antonio Martino - Ettore Alvaro, Dizionario dei dialetti della Calabria meridionale, Qualecultura, Vibo Valentia 2010. .
 Gerhard Rohlfs, Nuovo Dizionario Dialettale della Calabria. Longo, Ravenna, 1977  (6th reedition, 2001)
 Gerhard Rohlfs, Dizionario dialettale delle tre Calabrie. Milano-Halle, 1932-1939.
 Gerhard Rohlfs, Vocabolario supplementare dei dialetti delle Tre Calabrie (che comprende il dialetto greco-calabro di Bova) con repertorio toponomastico. Verl. d. Bayer. Akad. d. Wiss., München, 2 volumi, 1966-1967
 Gerhard Rohlfs, Vocabolario dei dialetti salentini (Terra d'Otranto). Verl. d. Bayer. Akad. d. Wiss., München, 2 volumi (1956-1957) e 1 suppl. (1961)
 Gerhard Rohlfs, Supplemento ai vocabolari siciliani. Verlag der Bayer, München, Akad. d. Wiss., 1977
 Gerhard Rohlfs, Historische Sprachschichten im modernen Sizilien. Verlag der Bayer, München, Akad. d. Wiss., 1975
 Gerhard Rohlfs, Studi linguistici sulla Lucania e sul Cilento. Congedo Editore, Galatina, 1988 (translation by Elda Morlicchio, Atti e memorie N. 3, Università degli Studi della Basilicata).
 Gerhard Rohlfs, Mundarten und Griechentum des Cilento, in Zeitschrift für Romanische Philologie, 57, 1937, pp. 421– 461

References

Dialects of Italian
Extreme Southern Italian dialects